John Howard Bertram Masterman (1867–1933) was the first Anglican Bishop of Plymouth from 1923 to 1933.

In authorship he is known as J. H. B. Masterman. His works ranged from religion to political and in the First World War he was asked to write two of the tracts distributed to troops to assure them that they were doing God's will.

Life
He was the second son of Thomas W. Masterman of Rotherfield Hall in Sussex. His younger brother was the natural historian Arthur Masterman FRS FRSE.

Masterman was the grandson of William Brodie Gurney (and a distant relation to Elizabeth Fry through him) and the brother of the Liberal MP Charles Frederick Gurney Masterman. He was the husband of Theresa and father of Cyril Masterman OBE.

Masterman was educated at University College School and St John's College, Cambridge. He was a distinguished academic and held incumbencies at  St Aubyn's Church, Devonport and St Mary-le-Bow in the City of London before his ordination to the episcopate in 1923, a position he held until his death 10 years later.

Publications

A History of the British Constitution
The Dawn of Mediaeval Europe, 476-918 (Six Ages of European History: Vol. 1) (1909)
Parliament: Its History and Work (1912)
The Life Beyond Death war tract no.7 (1914)
The King Needs You war tract no.8 (1914)
The Age of Milton (1915)
A Century of British Foreign Policy (1919)
Studies in the Book of Revelation (1919)
Clerical Incomes
Birmingham: The Story of English Towns (1920)

His hymn, "Almighty Father, who dost give", was included in The Australian Hymn Book, 1977, no.541, set to the tune "Vermont" by the Australian composer, Alfred Ernest Floyd.

Notes

External links

 

20th-century Church of England bishops
Anglican bishops of Plymouth
People educated at University College School
Alumni of St John's College, Cambridge
Fellows of St John's College, Cambridge
Academics of the University of Birmingham
1867 births
1933 deaths
Presidents of the Cambridge Union